Eduard Pütz (13 February 1911, in Illerich – 18 January 2000, in Bad Münstereifel) was a German composer and music teacher.

Selected works
 Pütz's scores are published by Schott Music, Edition Tonger, Tonos Musikverlag and Hans Gerig Verlag.
Opera
 Riders to the Sea, Opera in 1 act (1972); libretto by Heinrich Böll after John Millington Synge

Orchestral
 Invention für Barbara for string orchestra (1956)
 Concerto grasso for string orchestra and jazz-combo (1981)
 Blue Fantasy (1996)
 Tagebuchblätter aus Frankreich

Concertante
 Concerto giocoso for piano and orchestra (1979)
 Pyrenäen-Rhapsodie (Pyrenees Rhapsody), 3 Impressions for piano and orchestra (1984)
 Concerto for cello and orchestra (1985)
 Romanze for alto saxophone, cello, string orchestra and percussion (1989)

Chamber music
 Sonatina for cello and piano (1963)
 Improvisation modale for flute and piano (1964)
 Nugae, 7 Little Pieces for recorder, celesta and guitar (1969)
 Ballade für T.S. for guitar (1973)
 Tenso for shakuhachi and guitar (1975)
 5 Poèmes for violin and piano (1978)
 Canto épico for string quartet (1981)
 Die Marionetten der Ree Loo, Garden Music for violin and piano (1983)
 Meditationen for viola and guitar (1983)
 Frammenti for 4 violas (1986)
 Cries in the Dark, Blues for saxophone and string quartet (1986)
 Lydian Romance for cello and piano (1986)
 "O Welt...", Quartet for oboe, violin, viola and cello (1987)
 Sonata for 7 cellos (1988)
 Sonata for viola and piano (1988)
 Arabeschi capricciosi for flute and guitar (1989)
 Funny Serenades for violin and piano (1989)
 Traumstück for viola and harp (1989)
 Adagietto for cello and piano (1990)
 Blues for Benni for viola and piano (1991)
 Blues Fantasy for 6 cellos (1991)
 Dancing Strings for string quartet (1991)
 Trio for clarinet, cello and piano (1991)
 Tango passionato for 4 cellos (1992)
 Capricious Waltz for flute and piano (1993)
 Twilight Dream for violin and piano (1993)
 Notturno pastorale for oboe and piano (1993)
 Short Stories, 10 Little Pieces for cello and piano (1994)
 Serenade for treble recorder and accordion (1994)
 String Quartet No. 2 (1994)
 Piano Trio (1996)
 Why?, Impressions for 4 saxophones (1996)
 Blue Waltz for flute and piano (1997)
 Jazz Capriccio for alto saxophone and piano (1998)

Harpsichord
 Suite baroque for harpsichord (or piano) (1977)

Organ
 Rosa mystica

Piano
 Sonatina in B (1945)
 Frohes Musizieren, 6 Little Pieces for piano 4-hands (1947)
 Auf dem Rummelplatz, Musik für Hansmartin, Little Pieces (1948)
 Fünf Bagatellen (5 Bagatelles) (1950)
 Sonatina in F (1960)
 Hälfte des Lebens, Klavierstück in 2 movements after a poem by Friedrich Hölderlin (1975)
 Litaniae alle cinque (1976)
 Mr. Clementi Goin' on Holidays, Short Exercises in Blues and Rock Styles (1976)
 Toccata bruta (1976)
 Capriccio, Notturno und Blues (1980)
 12 Präludien zum Gebrauch an Sonntagnachmittagen (12 Preludes for Use on Sunday Afternoons) (1984)
 Sentimental Serenades (1987)
 I'm Sorry, Mr. Czerny, Little Jazz and Jazz-related Pieces (1988)
 Jazz Sonata (1988)
 Let's Swing, Mr. Bach!, 6 Piano Pieces in "Play-Bach" Style (1991)
 Pas de deux, Petit Ballet for piano 4-hands (1991)
 Waltzing the Blues, 3 Jazz Waltzes (1991)
 Young People's Music Box, 12 Easy Pieces (1992)
 Nachtstücke (Night Music) (1993)
 Let's Play Together, 10 Jazzy Pieces for piano 4-hands (1994)
 How about That, Mr. Offenbach!, Can-Can Fantasy (1995)
 Valsette (1996)
 Jazz-Sonatine (1998)
 Take It Easy, 3 Little Piano Pieces in Jazz Style (2000)

Vocal
 When We Dead Awaken for soprano, flute, electric guitar, electric piano, percussion and double bass (1974); words by Rudi Holzapfel
 Requiem im Park for mezzo-soprano, oboe, clarinet, horn, bassoon, cello, piano and bongos (1980); words by Ursula Claude
 Melodie am Abend for baritone and piano (1981)

Choral
 Johnny John, 5 Impressions for male chorus (1964); words by Hansjochem Kunze
 Der irre Spielmann for mixed chorus (1993); words by Joseph von Eichendorff
 Requiem nach Texten des alten und neuen Testamentes for soprano, tenor, baritone, mixed chorus and orchestra (1994)

Notes

External links
 Eduard Pütz profile at Schott Music

1911 births
2000 deaths
20th-century German composers
People from Cochem-Zell
Recipients of the Cross of the Order of Merit of the Federal Republic of Germany